Camilla Rutherford (born 7 August 1983) is a Scottish photojournalist who lives in Wānaka, New Zealand. Rutherford specializes in outdoor sports photography and often shoots in the mountains of New Zealand. She shoots things from sports, travel, and lifestyle.

Personal
Rutherford was born in Edinburgh, Scotland, on 7 August 1983 to a family of five children. She later became a ski instructor. She studied at St. Martins College of Art in London where she earned an Arts Honors Degree. Rutherford traveled to South Island of New Zealand went to Wānaka. She married Tim Rutherford and has a son. Before she moved to Wānaka, she alternated between Verbier, Switzerland, and Wānaka so that she could both live in the southern and northern hemisphere. After she married Tim, she moved to his farm in Tarras. She settled down officially in Wānaka. The South Island is filled with peaks and lakes where the bottom can be seen from the top. She went to Wānaka for the outdoor factor and that is where she likes to photograph the most. According to Rutherford, the outdoors are where the pictures turn out the best. Rutherford shoots mostly in the mountains all over New Zealand to get her perfect shots. She says, Beautiful things happen when people and the mountains meet.

Career
Rutherford grew up in Scotland and has worked as a freelance photographer since graduating from St. Martins College in London, with a major in Theatre Design. Her background in theatre led to her interest in photography and her love of skiing. She started as a ski instructor with a camera and is now an award-winning photographer. To add to her interest in photography, she launched her new website, in 2009.  The Faction Collective ski company advertised her website to their users to promote her work. Rutherford left her home in Scotland to go to New Zealand to resume her love for skiing. She started shooting with her iPhone 4 before getting her Canon camera. She shot in the winter for four years before moving to Wānaka and shooting her first summer photos there. Wānaka is not far from Mount Aspiring National Park where she sometimes takes photographs. She also travels to Nepal, China, Japan, India and Switzerland to get some shots as well. Usually using her Canon 5D Mark 3 camera, she says capturing the athletes in their element is the most critical part in telling the story within the picture. The landscapes and terrain in Wānaka help produce her work. "It can be as simple as someone standing admiring a vista, not even doing anything extreme but simply taking it all in, and this gives a whole new meaning to the photo", Rutherford says. She has many pictures published on her website, social media, and Vimeo made a slideshow to display her work. Many of her pictures have been published in travel magazines all over the world.  Air New Zealand used her pictures in their advertisements in Sydney and Melbourne's Central train stations as part of an ad campaign for Air NZ. Rutherford is supported by F-Stop Gear, Peak Design, Cecilia Gallery, Smith Optics and Faction Skis.

Notable works of photography
 Red Bull Competition in 2010
 Scandinavian Photo Challenge by Nikon in 2011
 Pro Photographer Showdown finalist in 2012
 New Zealand Geographic Photographer of the Year finalist in 2013
 Outside Magazine's Best Travel photography in 2014
 New Zealand Press Photographer of the Year in 2015
 World's best female action sports photographers by Still Stoked
 New Zealand Geographic Photographer of the Year finalist in 2018

Impact 
The Outdoor Journal wrote that female photographers like Rutherford and several others challenged our ideas about women could do in what had been a male dominated area of outdoor adventure and sport photography and this inspires other women.

"Photographing people in landscapes is a passion of mine. I guess that's why I love shooting adventure sports," says Rutherford.

Reactions 
When Rutherford won the Scandinavian Photo Challenge, judge Seb Kemp commented, "Her show was a stunning show where every shot was a scorcher, the edit was well timed and balanced, and there was plenty of story and narrative in the slideshow. All judges were unanimous that hers was the top show. Judging by the reactions from the audience, we obviously made the right choice."

Awards
Rutherford was a finalist in the Wings category of the Red Bull Competition in 2010, shooting BASE jumper Josie Symons in Mt. Aspiring National Park. In 2011, Rutherford got together with a group of mountain bike photographers in Are, Sweden, for the Scandinavian Photo Challenge by Nikon, which she won. She was featured in the Exposure section of Outside Magazine in 2011. Rutherford appeared as a finalist in the Pro Photographer Showdown in 2012. She was also a finalist in the New Zealand Geographic Photographer of the Year in 2013. Rutherford was featured in Outside Magazines Best Travel photography in 2014 with a picture of moonlight bliss in New Zealand. Rutherford was one of the winners of the 2015 New Zealand Press Photographer of the Year. Her photos were displayed as part of an exhibition The Botanist in Auckland on 9 December 2015. Rutherford was also voted one of the world's best female action sports photographers by Still Stoked. In 2018, she was a finalist in the New Zealand Geographic Photographer of the Year.

References

External links 
 Camilla Rutherford Photography
 Camilla Rutherford slideshow

1983 births
Living people
People from Wānaka
Scottish women photographers
21st-century Scottish photographers
New Zealand photographers
21st-century women photographers